Pont Reading is a historic home located in the Ardmore section of Haverford Township, Delaware County, Pennsylvania. It was the residence of shipbuilder and architect Joshua Humphreys, in which he lived his entire life. It was named after his family's homestead, Reading Pont in Wales.  Humphreys is most notable for his design of the famous USS Constitution, or "Old Ironsides".  The home was built of stone, now stuccoed, in 1730, around a log cabin dating to 1683.  The rear kitchen wing was added in 1813. The building is an excellent example of upper-class colonial architecture.

The house, which is a private residence, is listed on the National Register of Historic Places.

In March 2007, Cookie Magazine published an article titled "To the Manor Born" about the house and its owners.  The article included internal photographs. The house's owners since 2003 (Chris DeWitt/Oscar Yague) oversaw major restoration to maintain the property.

Gallery

References

External links
 Pont Reading House, 2713 Haverford Road (Haverford Township), Havertown, Delaware County, PA: 3 photos, 2 data pages, and 1 photo caption page at Historic American Buildings Survey

Houses on the National Register of Historic Places in Pennsylvania
Houses completed in 1730
Houses in Delaware County, Pennsylvania
National Register of Historic Places in Delaware County, Pennsylvania